Min Mahagiri (lit. "Lord of the Great Mountain;" also called Eindwin Nat), son of a famous blacksmith, U Tint Daw. His given name was Maung Tint De (Nga Tinde) or Mr Handsome. He was extremely strong, able to break the tusks of an elephant. The King of Tagaung was worried, lest he attempt to usurp his throne, so Maung Tint De hid himself in a village. As a stratagem, the king married Maung Tint De's sister, Saw Me Ya, also called Myat Hla or Shwe Myet-hna (Golden Face), to become one of his queens. He persuaded Saw Me Ya to ask her brother to come out of hiding so that he could be given a high office. However, when Maung Tint De came out of hiding, the king had him arrested and burned alive tied to a champac (sagawabin) tree. His sister (see below) also died with him and the two became evil Nats resident in that tree, periodically feasting on people who happened to come near the tree.  The King of Tagaung (Tagaung Min) had the tree cut down and cast into the waters of the Irrawaddy River where it floated, coming to rest in the kingdom in Bagan ruled by King Thinligyaung (344-387), when the two Nats appeared in a dream apprising the king of their plight. They offered to guard the city if they were given a place to dwell. King Thinligyaung had the trunk carried to Mount Popa, divided into two parts (one for each Nat) and carved with human features. Henceforth, Maung Tint De was to be known as the Lord of the Great Mountain. They were also enshrined on either side of the city's Tharabha Gate, Maung Tint De on the right and Shwe Myet-hna on the left. Later kings had golden heads made of the two Nats and had these heads mounted on pillars at Mt Popa (the ones from 1812 are still worshiped at the mountain).

References

02
People executed by burning